The Battle of Badajoz may refer to:

 Battle of Badajoz (1812), during the Peninsular War
 Battle of Badajoz (1936), during the Spanish Civil War

See also
 Siege of Badajoz (disambiguation)